In mathematics, a Jónsson–Tarski algebra or Cantor algebra is an algebraic structure encoding a bijection from an infinite set  onto the product . The term Cantor algebra is also occasionally used to mean the Boolean algebra of all clopen subsets of the Cantor set, or the Boolean algebra of Borel subsets of the reals modulo meager sets (sometimes called the Cohen algebra).

The group of order-preserving automorphisms of the free Jónsson–Tarski algebra on one generator is the Thompson group .

Definition

The definition for type > 2 is similar but with  projection operators.

Example

References

 

 

Algebraic structures